In Dzogchen, rigpa (Skt. vidyā; "knowledge") is knowledge of the ground. The opposite of rigpa is ma rigpa (avidyā, ignorance). A practitioner who has attained the state of rigpa and is able to rest there continuously is called a Rigdzin (see Vidyadhara), which may be used as a title either pre- or post-nominally.

Rigpa (knowledge)

Rigpa (Sanskrit: vidyā, 'knowledge') is a central concept in Dzogchen. According to Ācārya Malcolm Smith:

Rigpa is the knowledge of the ground. It has also come to mean the 'pristine awareness' that is the fundamental ground itself. Erik Pema Kunsang translates a text which provides basic definitions of rigpa and ma rigpa in a Dzogchen context:

Rigpa has two aspects, namely kadag and lhun grub. Kadag means "purity" or specifically "primordial purity". Lhun grub in Tibetan normally implies automatic, self-caused or spontaneous actions or processes. As quality of rigpa it means 'spontaneous presence' It may also mean 'having a self-contained origin', being primordially existent, without an origin, self-existent. This division is the Dzogchen equivalent of the more common Mahayana wisdom and compassion division.

Closely related terms are ye shes (Skt. jñāna, pristine consciousness) which is "the original, unadulterated state of consciousness" and wisdom (shes rab, Skt. prajña). Rigpa is also described as "reflexively self-aware primordial wisdom." Thus, wisdom is nothing other than rigpa. The analogy given by Dzogchen masters is that one's true nature is like a mirror which reflects with complete openness, but is not affected by the reflections; or like a crystal ball that takes on the colour of the material on which it is placed without itself being changed. The knowledge that ensues from recognizing this mirror-like clarity (which cannot be found by searching nor identified) is called rigpa.

Sam van Schaik translates rigpa as "gnosis" which he glosses as "a form of awareness aligned to the nirvanic state, free from all delusion". He notes that other definitions of rigpa include "free from elaborations" (srpos bral), "non conceptual" (rtog med) and "transcendent of the intellect" (blo 'das). It is also often paired with emptiness, as in the contraction rig stong (gnosis-emptiness).

The unconditioned nature of rigpa is described in the Longchen Nyingthig as follows:

John W. Pettit notes that rigpa is seen as beyond affirmation and negation, acceptance and rejection, and therefore it is known as "natural" (ma bcos pa) and "effortless" (rtsol med) once recognized. Because of this, Dzogchen is also known as the pinnacle and final destination of all paths.

Ācārya Malcolm Smith also notes that the atemporal nature of the basis also applies to the presence of the basis in sentient beings as rigpa:

As Alexander Berzin notes, all of the good qualities (yon-tan) of a Buddha are already "are innate (lhan-skyes) to rigpa, which means that they arise simultaneously with each moment of rigpa, and primordial (gnyugs-ma), in the sense of having no beginning."

Dzogchen texts refer to the basis and its rigpa as it is present in sentient beings as the sugatagarbha. Vimalamitra's Commentary states that "because the aim of buddhahood exists in the manner of a seed in the pristine consciousness of one’s vidyā, there is definitely success through practice."

Dzogchen texts also describe how rigpa is connected to the energy body. Dzogchen tantras explain that rigpa can be located in the center of the human body, in the heart centre. The Realms and Transformations of Sound Tantra states: "The jewel present within the heart in the center of one’s body is great pristine consciousness."

Furthermore, the Self-Arisen Vidyā Tantra states:

Dzogchen tantras also discuss the related topic of the energy body, mainly the nāḍīs, vāyus, and bindus (rtsa, rlung, and thig le; channels, winds and circles).

Immanence

According to van Schaik, there is a certain tension in Dzogchen thought (as in other forms of Buddhism) between the idea that samsara and nirvana are immanent within each other and yet are still different. In texts such as the Longchen Nyingtig for example, the basis and rigpa are presented as being "intrinsically innate to the individual mind" and not "as states to be attained or developed."

The Great Perfection Tantra of the Expanse of Samantabhadra’s Wisdom, using the Adi-Buddha Samantabhadra as a symbol for enlightenment, states:

Likewise, Longchenpa (14th century), writes in his Illuminating Sunlight:

In the Longdé texts (and in other works), a common term used to denote the immanent enlightened nature is bodhicitta (byang chub sems).

This lack of difference between these two states, their non-dual (advaya) nature, corresponds with the idea that change from one to another doesn't happen due to an ordinary process of causation but is an instantaneous and perfect 'self-recognition' (rang ngo sprod) of what is already innately (lhan-skyes) there. According to John W. Pettit, this idea has its roots in Indian texts such as Nagarjuna's Mulamadhyamakakarika, which states that samsara and nirvana are not separate and that there is no difference between the "doer", the "going" and the "going to" (i.e. the ground, path and fruit).

Practice

Dzogchen practices aim to attain rigpa and integrate this into everyday life:

The Menngagde or 'Instruction Class' of Dzogchen teachings are divided into two parts: trekchö and tögal (thod rgal). Ron Garry: 

In Dzogchen, a fundamental point of practice is to distinguish rigpa from sems (citta, (grasping) mind). According to the 14th Dalai Lama, "sems is the mind which is temporarily obscured and distorted by thoughts based upon the dualistic perceptions of subject and object." Rigpa is pure awareness free from such distortions. Cittata, the nature of mind, is the inseparable unity of awareness and emptiness, or clarity and emptiness, which is the basis for all the ordinary perceptions, thoughts and emotions of the ordinary mind.

Citing Dodrupchen Jikme Tenpe Nyima, the 14th Dalai Lama states the full measure of rigpa occurs with the third vision.

Ma rigpa (ignorance)

Ma rigpa (avidyā) is the opposite of rigpa or knowledge. Ma rigpa is ignorance, delusion or unawareness, the failure to recognize the nature of the basis. An important theme in Dzogchen texts is explaining how ignorance arises from the basis or Dharmata, which is associated with ye shes or pristine consciousness. Automatically arising unawareness (lhan-skyes ma-rigpa) exists because the basis has a natural cognitive potentiality which gives rise to appearances. This is the ground for samsara and nirvana.

When consciousness fails to recognize that all phenomena arise as the creativity (rtsal) of the nature of mind and misses its own luminescence or does not "recognize its own face", sentient beings arise instead of Buddhas. Ma rigpa is explained in Vimalamitra's Great Commentary as follows:

According to Vimalamitra's Illuminating Lamp, delusion arises because sentient beings "lapse towards external mentally apprehended objects". This external grasping is then said to produce sentient beings out of dependent origination. This dualistic conceptualizing process which leads to samsara is termed manas as well as "awareness moving away from the ground". However, some beings do not lapse into dualism by externalizing their own display and instead immediately recognize all phenomena which arise from the basis as the insubstantial appearances of their own nature. These beings immediately become Buddhas.

Thus, out of the basis, sentient beings arise due to ignorance/delusion, while Buddhas arise due to recognition and wisdom. As Tulku Urgyen Rinpoche notes, a sentient being is "empty cognizance suffused with ignorance" while the mind of a Buddha is "empty cognizance suffused with rigpa".

Longchenpa explains the process of how rigpa (rendered here as "gnosis") lapses into ignorance in his Tsigdön Dzö as follows:

Three kinds of ignorance 
The Seminal Heart texts posits "three kinds of ignorance" (ma rig pa gsum), which according to Higgins are "three progressive phases of error":

 Ignorance of single identity that is the cause (bdag nyid gcig pa'i ma rig pa), the most fundamental ignorance and the source of all error. It is the primordial failure to recognize the single source of rigpa and ma rigpa, i.e. the nondual empty Essence of the Basis.
 Co-emergent ignorance (lhan cig skyes pa'i ma rig pa), which is related to not seeing arising appearances as they really are. It is the failure to recognize the Nature of the Basis (i.e. clarity) which arises simultaneously together with cognition.
 Conceptually elaborated ignorance (kun tu brtags pa’i ma rig pa), also known as imputed ignorance and relates to the imputation of false and dualistic concepts onto appearances, particularly related to "self" and "other".

Longchenpa explains the three forms of ignorance as follows:

Samsara and nirvana

As Sam van Schaik notes, for authors like Longchenpa and Jigme Lingpa, the basis has the potential to manifest in both a samsaric and a nirvanic modes. Therefore, even though rigpa is immanent, in sentient beings this rigpa is an unripened rigpa which often manifests as ordinary consciousness (shes pa) and which may become deluded if it does not recognize its own nature. Buddhahood is attained through the recognition of rigpa (rig pa'i ngo sprod) or self-recognition (rang ngo sprod) of what is immanently present.

Seminal Heart texts also indicate a subtle difference between terms associated with delusion (such as kun gzhi or alaya, and sems or mind) and terms associated with full enlightenment (Dharmakaya and rigpa). These terms stem from Indian Yogacara texts. In the Seminal Heart literature, the Ālaya and the Ālayavijñāna are associated with karmic imprints (vasana) of the mind and with mental afflictions (klesa). The "alaya for habits" is the basis (gzhi) together with ignorance (ma rigpa), which includes all sorts of obscuring habits and grasping tendencies. Thus, the Longchen Nyingthig compares the Ālaya to muddy water (which hides the brightness of wisdom and rigpa) and defines it as non-recognition, while the Dharmakaya is compared to clear water and defined as "undeluded awareness".

Regarding sems (mind) and rigpa (gnosis), the Longchen Nyingthig compares them to air and space respectively:

Longchenpa explains the difference thus:

Relationship with Indian Buddhist philosophies
Koppl notes that although later Nyingma authors such as Mipham attempted to harmonize the view of Dzogchen with Madhyamaka, the earlier Nyingma author Rongzom Chokyi Zangpo did not. Rongzom held that the views of sutra such as Madhyamaka were inferior to that of tantra. In contrast, the 14th Dalai Lama, in his book Dzogchen, concludes that Madhyamaka and Dzogchen come down to the same point. The view of reality obtained through Madhyamaka philosophy and the Dzogchen view of Rigpa can be regarded as identical. With regard to the practice in these traditions, however, at the initial stages there do seem certain differences in practice and emphasis.

According to Malcolm Smith, the Dzogchen view is also based on the Indian Buddhist Buddha-nature doctrine of the Tathāgatagarbha sūtras. According to the 14th Dalai Lama the Ground is the Buddha-nature, the nature of mind which is emptiness. According to Thrangu Rinpoche, Rangjung Dorje (1284–1339), the third Karmapa Lama (head of the Karma Kagyu) and Nyingma lineage holder, also stated that the Ground is Buddha-nature. According to Thrangu Rinpoche, "whether one does Mahamudra or Dzogchen practice, buddha nature is the foundation from which both of these meditations develop."

See also

 Bare attention
 Buddha-nature
 Choiceless awareness
 Kensho
 Luminous mind
 Mahamudra
 Rigpa (organization)
 Sahaja
 Samprajaña, apramāda and atappa
 Tsa lung
 Turiya
 Wisdom in Buddhism

Notes

Quotes

References

Citations

Works cited

 
 
 
 
 
 
 
 
 
 
 
 
 
 
 
 
 
 
 
   (hc);  (pbk).

Further reading

External links
 Hitting the Essence in Three Words

Bon
Dzogchen
Nondualism
Nyingma
Tibetan Buddhist philosophical concepts
Tibetan Buddhist practices
Tibetan words and phrases